The 2009 Singapore League Cup kicked off on 1 June.

For this season, the 12 teams will be divided into four groups of three in the preliminary round which will be played on a round-robin basis. The top two teams from each group qualify for the next round which will be played on a knockout (single elimination) basis.

The 2009 League Cup Final took place on 19 June (Friday) at the Jalan Besar Stadium.

Group stage
The draw for the group stage was held on May 14, 2009. The 12 S-League teams are drawn into 4 groups of 3

Winners and runners up of each group will qualify for the quarter-finals.

Group A

Group B

Group C

Group D

Knockout stage

Bracket

Quarter-finals

Semi-finals

Third-Place Playoff

Final

Man of the Match:
 Rene Komar

MATCH OFFICIALS
Assistant referees:
Jeffrey Goh
Edwin Tan
Fourth official: T Aravinthan

MATCH RULES
90 minutes.
30 minutes of extra-time if necessary.
Penalty shoot-out if scores still level.
Seven named substitutes
Maximum of 3 substitutions.

See also
 S.League
 Singapore Cup
 Singapore Charity Shield
 Football Association of Singapore
 List of football clubs in Singapore

External links
 SLeague.Com: 2009  League Cup Results and Fixtures

2009
League Cup
2009 domestic association football cups
June 2009 sports events in Asia